The G.R. Kinney Company was an American manufacturer and retailer of shoes 1894 until September 16, 1998. Its listing on the New York Stock Exchange, symbol KNN, began in March 1923. The shoe concern was started by George Romanta Kinney whose father ran a general store in rural Candor, New York. The father became indebted and George vowed to repay his indebtedness. In 1894, at the age of 28, he had saved enough to purchase a Lester retail outlet in Waverly, New York. Lester Shoe of Binghamton, New York was the predecessor to the Endicott Johnson Corporation. Kinney succeeded by selling affordably priced shoes to working Americans.

The business chain numbered 362 stores at the conclusion of 1929, with 44 of these opening in the final year of the decade. Foot Locker began as a division of the Kinney Shoe Corporation in 1974.

Chain and later a subsidiary

Kinney Shoes was the largest family chain shoe retailer in the United States at the beginning of 1936, with 335 stores operating nationwide. Although it was selling more shoes at the conclusion of 1936 than in 1929, its dollar volume was 20% to 30% below 1929.

On August 31, 1963, the G.R. Kinney Company was sold to F.W. Woolworth. Prior to this it was a subsidiary of the Brown Shoe Company which sold it for $45 million. The firm was renamed the Kinney Shoe Corporation and continued as a fully owned subsidiary of Woolworth. It retained its own eleven member board of directors and an existing panel of corporate officers.

Foot Locker exclusivity
The company continued operating throughout the 1960s and 1970s with divisions named Stylco (1967), Susie Casuals (1968), and Foot Locker (1974). On September 16, 1998, the Venator Group, formerly known as Woolworth, announced that Kinney's 467 shoe stores and 103 Footquarters stores would close. The Foot Locker division, started in 1974, continues to this day, with Venator changing its name in 2001 to Foot Locker. Foot Locker also maintains the trademarks of the Kinney and Woolworth brands.

See also
 Thom McAn

References

External links
G.R. Kinney Company history

F. W. Woolworth Company
Foot Locker
Shoe companies of the United States
Shoe brands
Footwear retailers of the United States
Defunct companies based in New York City
American companies established in 1894
Clothing companies established in 1894
Retail companies established in 1894
Retail companies disestablished in 1998
1894 establishments in New York (state)
1998 disestablishments in New York (state)
Tioga County, New York